Hudun District is a historical district in the eastern Sool region of Somaliland. Its capital lies at Hudun. The border between Hudun District and Las Anod District goes through the town of buur anod, also called buur aanood, a town that lies in between the towns of dib shabeel to the north, and daryaha (daryaha) to the south. This was the site of the largest battle between Darawiish and colonial forces in 1904.

See also
Administrative divisions of Somaliland
Regions of Somaliland
Districts of Somaliland
Somalia–Somaliland border

References

External links
 Districts of Somalia
 Administrative map of Xudun District

Districts of Somaliland
Sool